Frizza is an Italian surname. Notable people with the surname include:

Debbie Frizza, Australian cricketer
 (born 1985), Italian footballer
Riccardo Frizza (born 1971), Italian conductor

See also
Rizza (surname)

Italian-language surnames